Norman Phillips may refer to:

 Norman Phillips (Coronation Street), a character on the soap opera Coronation Street
 Norman A. Phillips, American meteorologist